Herbert Greaves (13 October 1898 – 17 November 1953) was a Barbadian cricketer. He played in eight first-class matches for the Barbados cricket team from 1923 to 1930.

See also
 List of Barbadian representative cricketers

References

External links
 

1898 births
1953 deaths
Barbadian cricketers
Barbados cricketers
People from Edmonton, London